Missing is a British daytime television crime drama series starring Pauline Quirke and Mark Wingett. The series is set in a busy, under-resourced missing-persons unit, and follows the team led by DS Mary Jane "MJ" Croft (Quirke). The first series of five episodes aired on BBC One in 2009, with an extended second series of 10 episodes airing in 2010. It was filmed in and around Dover, and Tonbridge. The series also starred Felix Scott and Pooja Shah as Croft's sidekicks, Jason Doyle and Amy Garnett. Guest stars who appeared throughout the series run include Paul Nicholas, Brooke Kinsella, Gary Lucy, and Sylvia Syms.

It was the first British daytime regular series to be broadcast on the BBC since Doctors in 2000, after Channel 5 brought the rights to Neighbours in 2008 and Missing, was shown on Neighbours former 14:15 slot and since Missing was first broadcast, Moving On, Land Girls, The Indian Doctor, Justice, 32 Brinkburn Street, The Case, Secrets and Words, Nick Nickleby (as a mini-series), Privates, Father Brown, WPC 56, The Coroner, The Moonstone (as a mini-series), Shakespeare & Hathaway: Private Investigators and The Mallorca Files have been commissioned by BBC Daytime, including Pitching In, London Kills and Hope Street which have both been broadcast on BBC One Wales, Acorn TV and BBC One Northern Ireland respectively before being broadcast on BBC One. Moving On, Father Brown, Shakespeare & Hathaway: Private Investigators and The Mallorca Files are current BBC Daytime Productions all have been shown after Doctors.

Production
The first series was commissioned in July 2008 to be broadcast in the daytime schedule, alongside a new series Missing Live, which follows the work of the police and a missing-persons charity searching for people who go missing. A second series was commissioned in October 2009. BBC daytime controller Liam Keelan commented: "We have seen how successful combining drama and factual programming has been in BBC Daytime - extending the run of Missing will create an even greater sense of event."

Main cast
 Pauline Quirke as DS Mary Jane 'MJ' Croft – head of Dover's Missing Persons Unit
 Mark Wingett as Danny Hayworth – former crime journalist, now a radio DJ for Dover Radio; friend of DS Croft
 Felix Scott as DC Jason Doyle – MPU Detective; former member of the vice squad who is currently pursuing his sergeant's exams
 Pooja Shah as Amy Garnett – MPU Civilian Technical Assistant
 Jamie Belman as DC Josh Kemplin - former member of the Flying Squad who joins the team in series two
 Adjoa Andoh as DCI Lauren Ford - head of CID
 Roy Hudd as Jack Croft - MJ and Ellen's estranged father
 Helen Baker as Ellen Croft - MJ Croft's sister, who was thought to be dead

Episode list

Series 1 (2009)

Series 2 (2010)

References

External links
 
 

2009 British television series debuts
2010 British television series endings
2000s British drama television series
2010s British drama television series
BBC television dramas
Missing UK
Television shows set in Kent
Television shows shot in Kent
BBC Daytime television series